American Music is the debut album by American rock band The Blasters, released in 1980.

The song "Marie Marie" became a breakthrough hit for Shakin' Stevens in 1980 (from This Ole House). Matchbox recorded the song for their 1980 album Midnite Dynamos. In 1997, the album was released on CD by Hightone Records.

The tracks "Marie Marie" and "American Music" were rerecorded for The Blasters' second and wider-distributed eponymous album.

Track listing
All songs composed by Dave Alvin, except where noted.

Side 1
"American Music" – 2:08
"Real Rock Drive" (Bill Haley) – 2:03
"Barefoot Rock" (Joseph Scott, Bud Harper) – 2:19
"I Don't Want To" – 1:56
"Marie Marie" – 2:02
"I Wish You Would" (Billy Boy Arnold) - 2:41			
"She Ain't Got the Beat" (Dave Alvin, Phil Alvin) - 1:30

Side 2		
"Flattop Joint" - 2:27			
"Crazy Baby" (Ron Volz, Ron Wemsman) - 2:26			
"Never No Mo' Blues" (Elsie McWilliams, Jimmie Rodgers) - 2:46			
"Buzz Buzz Buzz" (Robert Byrd, John Gray) - 2:06			
"She's Gone Away" (Phil Alvin) - 2:25			
"Barn Burning" - 3:36

CD bonus tracks, 1997		
"21 Days in Jail" (Willie Dixon, L.P. Weaver) - 2:12			
"Love 24 Hours a Day" (Ted Jarrett) - 3:10			
"I Fell in Love" (Unknown) - 1:57			
"So Glad" (Howlin' Wolf) - 2:19			
"Ashamed of Myself" (Rose Marie McCoy, Charlie Singleton) - 2:24			
"Lone Wolf" (R. Harris) - 3:19

Personnel
The Blasters
Phil Alvin - vocals, guitar, harmonica
Dave Alvin - lead guitar
John Bazz - bass
Bill Bateman - drums

References

External links

    

1980 debut albums
The Blasters albums